This is a list of Colombian billionaires based on an annual assessment of wealth and assets compiled and published by Forbes magazine in 2021.

2021 Colombian billionaires lst

See also
 The World's Billionaires
 List of countries by the number of billionaires

References

Colombian
Net worth
 
Billionaires